Lars-Erik Ragnar Wolfbrandt (8 December 1928 – 23 March 1991) was a Swedish sprinter who won a bronze medal in the 4 × 400 m relay at the 1948 Summer Olympics. He won two more bronze medals at the 1950 European Athletics Championships, in the 400 m and 4 × 400 m relay. At the 1952 Summer Olympics he competed in the 400 m, 800 m and 4 × 400 m relay; he finished eighth in the 800 m and failed to reach the finals in the 400 m events.

Nationally Wolfbrandt won five Swedish titles, in the 200 m (1948–49) and 400 m (1949–50 and 1954). His brother Herold was an association football player.

References

1928 births
1991 deaths
Swedish male sprinters
Olympic bronze medalists for Sweden
Athletes (track and field) at the 1948 Summer Olympics
Athletes (track and field) at the 1952 Summer Olympics
Olympic athletes of Sweden
European Athletics Championships medalists
Medalists at the 1948 Summer Olympics
Olympic bronze medalists in athletics (track and field)
20th-century Swedish people